Ryssota is a genus of air-breathing land snails, terrestrial pulmonate gastropod mollusks in the family Chronidae.

Species 
Species within the genus Ryssota include:
 Ryssota antoni (Semper, 1870)
 Ryssota dvitija (O. Semper, 1866)
 Ryssota gervaisii (Dubrueil, 1867)
 Ryssota mororum Pilsbry, 1924
 Ryssota mulleri (Pfeiffer,1854)
 Ryssota otaheitana (Férussac, 1820)
 Ryssota sagittifera (L. Pfeiffer, 1842)
 Ryssota sauli Bartsch, 1938
 Ryssota uranus (L. Pfeiffer, 1861)
 Ryssota webbi Bartsch, 1938
Species brought into synonymy
 Ryssota balerana (Bartsch, 1939): synonym of Lamarckiella balerana (Bartsch, 1939) (original combination)
 Ryssota lamarckiana (Lea, 1853): synonym of Lamarckiella stolephora lamarckiana (I. Lea, 1840) (superseded combination)
 Ryssota maxima (Pfeiffer, 1853): synonym of Pararyssota maxima (L. Pfeiffer, 1854) (superseded combination)
 Ryssota ovum (Valenciennes, 1827): synonym of Ryssota otaheitana ovum (Valenciennes, 1827)
 Ryssota oweniana (Pfeiffer, 1853): synonym of Lamarckiella oweniana (L. Pfeiffer, 1854) (superseded combination)
 Ryssota pachystoma  (Hombron & Jacquinot, 1841): synonym of Trukrhysa pachystoma (Hombron & Jacquinot, 1841) (superseded combination)
 Ryssota porphyria (Pfeiffer, 1854): synonym of Lamarckiella porphyria (L. Pfeiffer, 1842) (superseded combination)
 Ryssota quadrasi (Hidalgo, 1890): synonym of Pararyssota quadrasi (Hidalgo, 1887) (superseded combination)
 Ryssota rhea (Pfeiffer, 1853): synonym of Ryssota otaheitana rhea (L. Pfeiffer, 1855)
 Ryssota zeus (Jonas, 1842): synonym of Lamarckiella zeus (Jonas, 1843) (superseded combination)

References 

 Bank, R. A. (2017). Classification of the Recent terrestrial Gastropoda of the World. Last update: July 16th, 2017

External links
 Albers, J. C. (1850). Die Heliceen nach natürlicher Verwandtschaft systematisch geordnet. Berlin: Enslin. 262 pp.
 Albers, J. C.; Martens, E. von. (1860). Die Heliceen nach natürlicher Verwandtschaft systematisch geordnet von Joh. Christ. Albers. Ed. 2. Pp. i-xviii, 1-359. Leipzig: Engelman 

Chronidae